The Conococheague Mountain Tunnel was a proposed railroad tunnel in Perry County, Pennsylvania.  It was originally planned as part of the Path Valley Railroad, with the intent to link the Newport and Shermans Valley Railroad with the East Broad Top Railroad and the Tuscarora Valley Railroad further west.  Only about 100 feet of either end of the planned 2600 foot tunnel was completed in 1894.
The partially completed tunnel exists in Big Spring State Forest Picnic Area and Tuscarora State Forest. The north portal of the tunnel is still visible, but fenced off.

See also
 Photo of uncompleted tunnel

References

Railroad tunnels in Pennsylvania
3 ft gauge railways in the United States
Narrow gauge railroads in Pennsylvania
Transportation buildings and structures in Perry County, Pennsylvania
Unfinished buildings and structures in the United States